The Metro Rail Transit Line 4, also known as MRT Line 4, is an approved mass rapid transit line to be built in Metro Manila and Rizal in the Philippines. 

When completed, it will be the second rapid transit line serving the province of Rizal after the extension of LRT Line 2 to Antipolo, and is expected to significantly reduce the volume of vehicular traffic along Ortigas Avenue and improve connectivity in the eastern parts of the metropolis, including the nearby municipalities in southwestern Rizal.

The proposal, consisting of eleven stations, will be an elevated railway line with a right-of-way alignment along Granada Street, Ortigas Avenue and Taytay Diversion Road, linking suburban Taytay, Rizal to the Ortigas Center business district in eastern Metro Manila.

The project is expected to cost an estimated ₱59.3 billion or US$1.1 billion. According to the Department of Finance, the Philippine government is looking to fund the construction through the Asian Infrastructure Investment Bank and the Asian Development Bank (ADB). A US$1 billion loan from the ADB is expected to be signed in 2023.

Background

History

The first MRT Line 4 project was proposed in 1999 as a line between Recto Avenue, Manila and Batasan Hills, Quezon City. In the late 2010s, the proposed line was renumbered as the MRT Line 8 and the Quezon Memorial Circle–Batasan Hills segment became the MRT Line 7. Meanwhile, the right-of-way for the present Line 4 can be traced to the southeast extension of the LRT Line 2, which would either be an automated guideway transit (AGT) or heavy rail line in the same fashion as the Line 2, as well as a bus rapid transit collector line towards the town of Binangonan in Rizal.

As of 2021, the Ortigas Avenue corridor has an annual average daily traffic of 185,699 vehicles. However, only 9.07 percent of daily traffic comes from public utility vehicles including taxis. An average commute from Tikling in Taytay, Rizal to Ortigas CBD in Pasig City can take up to 3 hours during rush hour. This is the primary motivation to build a rail line in the vicinity to improve journey times between the two areas.

Development
A new LRT Line 4 project, was approved by the Investment Coordination Committee (ICC) of the National Economic and Development Authority in June 2015 as a public–private partnership project, with construction slated to begin in 2017 and a targeted opening date in 2021. However, the initial project was not pushed through until it was approved for a second time on December 20, 2019. The contract for the architectural and engineering design of the project was signed by the Department of Transportation and Spanish design consultant IDOM Consulting Engineering, Architecture, SA on October 1, 2021. Construction is slated to begin by the second quarter of 2022 and targets to be operational by 2028.

On October 12, 2022, the Department of Transportation confirmed that the Asian Development Bank (ADB) will extend a loan of US$1 billion for the project, with the signing of the loan expected to take place in 2023.

Construction
Pre-construction activities such as soil testing have already begun in some areas along Ortigas Avenue. Actual construction is expected to begin by the second quarter of 2024 and to be completed by 2027. Full operations shall begin by 2028.

Contract packages
There are five main components in the project. This includes one each for the mainline, station buildings, depot, electromechanical systems and rolling stock.

Route
The MRT-4 will start from the intersection of Nicanor Domingo Street and Granada Street in Valencia, Quezon City, one block away from Gilmore station of Line 2 in the west, to SM City Taytay in Dolores, Taytay in the east, passing through the cities of Mandaluyong and Pasig and the municipality of Cainta. An empty lot beside the Taytay Municipal Hall and Manila Club East Resort had been reserved for the depot.

A proposed expansion of the Line 7 system will traverse similar routes as Line 4. This extension, however, is still pending approvals.

2015 iteration
The first proposal in 2015 involves the construction of 13 elevated stations along Taytay Diversion Road, Ortigas Avenue, ADB Avenue, Shaw Boulevard, P. Sanchez Street, and V. Mapa Street (listed from east to west).

Alignment between Ortigas Center and LRT-2
The line is a component of the Manila East Rail Transit Project proposed by the Japanese government in February 2015 which aims to provide a medium-capacity rail transport system connecting central and eastern Metro Manila with the province of Rizal. Its proposed alignment is along Ortigas Avenue with an option to extend the line to as far east as the Rizal municipality of Angono on the Manila East Road, and west to either of the following terminals:
 Option 1: interchange with Santa Mesa station (PNR Metro South Commuter Line) via ADB Avenue, Sheridan Street, Pioneer Street, Boni Avenue, Aglipay Street and Lubiran Street.
 Option 2: interchange with V. Mapa station (LRT Line 2) via ADB Avenue, Shaw Boulevard, P. Sanchez Street and V. Mapa Street.
 Option 3: interchange with Gilmore station  (LRT Line 2) via a straight path following Ortigas Avenue and Gilmore Avenue in San Juan and its western extension Granada Street in Quezon City.

Option 2 was the chosen alignment of the study owing to its capability to serve the most demand that can alleviate traffic the most on the Taytay-Cainta-Pasig-Mandaluyong-Manila corridor. Construction did not push through despite receiving approval by President Benigno Aquino III last September 2015.

Design
The line will be a generally elevated mass rapid transit (MRT) railway with two tracks. 

Originally approved as a heavy monorail line in its MRT Line 4 iteration, the Project Description for scoping (PDS) published in September 2022 presented the possible options of constructing the line as a monorail, a light rail transit, or as a "mass rapid transit" (MRT) system. Of the three options, the MRT option was strongly recommended by IDOM due to ease of maintenance and abundance of technical suppliers. In addition to this, studies conducted by IDOM also determined that the ridership demand along the San Juan-Rizal corridor was higher than expected. Because of this, the recommendation to use a MRT system was accepted by the Department of Transportation later that month.

The guideway will use three different girder designs for the elevated sections: segmental box, precast concrete U-type and dapped-end girders. However, the design of the box girders will be different to that of the North–South Commuter Railway, having a more rounded U shape than that of the boxier design of the NSCR girders.

The line is expected to have a headway of 4 minutes, and can be further lessened to 2 minutes with the introduction of CBTC signaling.

Stations
The stations are divided into two types: the narrow-width and the standard-width stations. These will also have three levels with one each for ground access, concourse and platforms to be built on top of center islands.

Rolling stock
The line will initially use 5-car electric multiple unit trains. The stations are also designed for an expansion to 6 cars. A 5-car train is capable of carrying 1,000 passengers. To achieve the 4-minute headway target, up to 35 trainsets shall be ordered which corresponds to the number of rolling stock operators in the operations stage.

The electrification system remains unknown as of September 2022.

Depot
The Project Description for Scoping (PDS) report recommends the construction of the depot at the former Excelsior Villas site in Taytay, Rizal. It is located at the Rizal end of the line near the municipal hall. Other options include a vacant lot beside SM Taytay and at the Comeco compound in Pasig. The other two sites were put as secondary alternative locations to the Excelsior site as these require additional land acquisition. The Comeco location would also need a significant realignment in the right-of-way.

The depot is expected to have a 24-hour operation and will have stabling facilities, stabling track, traverser system, train storage, workshops and substation facilities.

Notes

References

Line 4
Line 4
Transportation in Rizal
Proposed public transportation in the Philippines
2028 in rail transport